Jarle Steinsland (born 10 July 1980) is a retired Norwegian football midfielder. He last played for FK Haugesund, joining the team after the 2007 season, coming from Bryne FK, and has played for Rosenborg BK in the Norwegian Premier League as well as SK Vard Haugesund.

References

Guardian's Stats Centre

1980 births
Living people
People from Tysvær
Norwegian footballers
Rosenborg BK players
Bryne FK players
FK Haugesund players
SK Vard Haugesund players
Eliteserien players
Norwegian First Division players
Association football midfielders
Sportspeople from Rogaland